The 2012 First FIA GT1 Slovakia round was an auto racing event held at the Automotodróm Slovakia Ring in Orechová Potôň, Slovakia on 9–10 June 2012. It was the fourth round of the 2012 FIA GT1 World Championship season. It was the first time the GT1 category visited the Slovakia Ring circuit. Valmon Racing Team Russia did not take part in the event.

The circuit was modified following the 2011 FIA GT3 races, which saw several cars become airborne as they crossed over the crest between turns two and three. In response to this, event organisers added a temporary tyre chicane on the approach to the crest, and designated the section of circuit from the second turn to the tyre chicane as a permanent yellow-flag area, banning overtaking on the approach to the chicane.

Qualifying

Qualifying result
For qualifying, Driver 1 participates in the first and third sessions while Driver 2 participates in only the second session.  The fastest lap for each session is indicated with bold.

Races

Qualifying Race

Championship Race

References

External links

Slovakia
FIA GT1